In 2019–20 season, De Graafschap played in the Eerste Divisie, the second tier of Dutch professional football. They finished 2nd, but were not promoted since promotion and relegation were cancelled as a result of the COVID-19 pandemic. They were knocked out of the KNVB Cup in the first round by Vitesse.

Competitions

Eerste Divisie

League table

KNVB Cup

Player Transfers

Players In

Players Out

Player statistics

Appearances and goals

References

De Graafschap
De Graafschap seasons